Hongqiao Subdistrict is a subdistrict of Wusu City, Xinjiang, People's Republic of China, located at the heart of the city's urban core. , it has 5 residential communities (社区) under its administration.

See also 
 List of township-level divisions of Xinjiang

References 

Township-level divisions of Xinjiang